Anping Old Street or Yanping Street is a historic street in Anping District, Tainan, Taiwan.

History
The street is the first merchant street established in Tainan, making it the oldest street in the city.

Architecture
The street passes through various shops and food stalls, selling souvenirs and handmade products.

See also
 List of roads in Taiwan
 List of tourist attractions in Taiwan

References

Streets in Taiwan
Transportation in Tainan